Kashaweogama Lake is a lake located in Thunder Bay District in northwestern Ontario, Canada. It is the head of the Marchington River. Highway 599 passes at the eastern tip of the lake.

References
Atlas of Canada topographic map 52J7 retrieved 2007-11-06

Lakes of Thunder Bay District